Deccan Queen is a 1936 Hindustani action-adventure film directed by Mehboob Khan. It was the first "stunt" film from Sagar Movietone and the first film for actor Surendra, who was credited as "Surendra Nath B.A., L.L.B.". The film helped launch him as a singing star. This was the only action film directed by Mehboob Khan as he later shifted to films with social and political slant. This was Mehboob Khan's second directorial venture after Al Hilal (1935). He asked Zia Sarhadi then an unknown small-time actor, to write the screenplay, dialogue and songs for Deccan Queen. The music direction was by Pransukh Nayak along with Ashok Ghosh. The cinematographer was Faredoon Irani. The film starred Surendra, Aruna Devi, Ramchandra Pal and Kayam Ali.

The film centre's around Aruna Devi in a double-role, one as the dreaded Deccan Queen out for revenge against treacherous men, and the other as a sober typist in love with the police inspector (Surendra) who is planning to nab Deccan Queen. The eponymous Deccan Queen was used for the heroine to show her swiftness in eluding the police.

Plot

When Lala Niranjanmal dies, his two children,  daughter Aruna (Aruna Devi) and son are cheated out of their inheritance by the fraudulent trustees. They incriminate Aruna in a crime for which she has to go to jail while her brother drifts away penniless and out of his mind. On release from jail, Aruna has vengeance on her mind and she becomes the fearful Deccan Queen. The police are quickly after her and police Inspector Suresh (Surendra) is put in charge to apprehend her. Vrinda (Aruna Devi) works for an Insurance company and meets Suresh. They both fall in love. It is soon realised that Vrinda and Deccan Queen resemble each other. Deccan Queen takes advantage of this. After several action scenes and the kidnapping of Vrinda by Aruna, things are sorted out when Suresh helps the Deccan Queen reveal the dishonest Trustees.

Cast
Surendra as Inspector Suresh
Aruna Devi as Aruna a.k.a. Deccan Queen and as the twin sister Vrinda
Ramchandra Pal
Pande
Pesi Patel
M. A. Mani
Kayam Ali
Bhudo Advani
Mehdi Raza
Gulzar
Kamala

Soundtrack
The film's music was composed by Pransukh Naik and its lyricist was Zia Sarhadi. The singers were Surendra, Aruna Devi and Ramchandra Pal. The song "Birha Ki Aag Lagi More Man Mein", sung by Surendra, started him on his way to stardom as a singing star and to be called the "(K. L.) Saigal of Bombay".

Song list:

References

External links

1936 films
1930s Hindi-language films
Films directed by Mehboob Khan
1930s Urdu-language films
Indian black-and-white films
Indian action adventure films
1930s action adventure films
Deccan Plateau